Nokko (born November 4, 1963) is a Japanese singer-songwriter, producer, and actress. She was the lead singer of the popular band "Rebecca," which had a string of hits in Japan in the 1980s. Under her stage name Nokko, she also had multiple hits in Japan throughout her solo career in the 1990s, and released an English-language album in the US produced and mixed by Goh Hotoda and Francois Kevorkian.

History
In 1990, she married Takehiko Kogure, former group leader of Rebecca. They divorced in 1993. In 2002, she married Goh Hotoda, a sound engineer who has mixed hit singles for artists including Madonna, Janet Jackson, and Hikaru Utada. They now live in Atami, Japan, where on August 1, 2006, the couple welcomed the birth of their daughter, Kano.

Legacy
Nokko's song "Ningyo" (mermaid), which was her 4th solo single on her 4th solo album, "Colored", was the theme song for the 1994 drama Toki o Kakeru Shōjo starring Yuki Uchida.

Discography

Original albums 
 Hallelujah (1992)
 I Will Catch U. (1993)
 Call Me Nightlife (1993)	
 Colored (1994)
 Rhyming Cafe (1996)	
  (1998)
 Viaje (2000)
 Kiss (2010) 
 THE NOKKO STORY (2013)
 TRUE WOMAN (2018)

Compilation albums 
 The Best of Nokko (1997)
 Remix Nokko (2000)
 Nokko's Selection, Nokko's Best (2006)

Singles 
 Crazy Clouds (1992)
  (1992)
 I Will Catch U (1993)
 Vivace (1993)
  (1994)
  (1994)
  (1995)
  (1995)
  (1996)
 Natural (1996)
  (1997)
  (1997)
  (1998)
  (1998)
  (1999)
  (1999)
  (2000)

References

External links 
  
 Fan page with complete discography 

1963 births
Living people
People from Saitama (city)
Ki/oon Music artists
Musicians from Saitama Prefecture
20th-century Japanese women singers
20th-century Japanese singers
21st-century Japanese women singers
21st-century Japanese singers